The Belgian State Railways Type 11 was a class of  steam locomotives for local passenger traffic, introduced in 1888.
It gradually replaced the Type 5 in this role.

Construction history
The locomotives were built by various manufacturers from 1888–1897.
The machines had an inside frame and outside cylinders and a Walschaert valve gear.

Bibliography

References

0-6-0T locomotives
Steam locomotives of Belgium
Standard gauge locomotives of Belgium
C n2t locomotives
Railway locomotives introduced in 1888